The men's triple jump event at the 2008 World Junior Championships in Athletics was held in Bydgoszcz, Poland, at Zawisza Stadium on 10 and 11 July.

Medalists

Results

Final
11 July

Qualifications
10 July

Group A

Group B

Participation
According to an unofficial count, 26 athletes from 20 countries participated in the event.

References

Triple jump
Triple jump at the World Athletics U20 Championships